Geoffrey Douglas Scott (March 2, 1938 — August 5, 2021) was a former journalist and Canadian Member of Parliament for the riding of Hamilton—Wentworth. He was a member of the Progressive Conservative Party of Canada caucus.

The riding of Hamilton-Wentworth became open when Tory incumbent Sean O'Sullivan resigned to become a Catholic priest in 1977.  Scott won it in a by-election held on October 16, 1978, and remained in office until 1993.

In his teenage years, Scott was a budding impressionist, a talent he occasionally displayed, but only on request, during his political career.  He formed a partnership with another budding impressionist, Rich Little, in the mid-1950s.

For many years, prior to becoming a politician, Scott worked as a political television reporter and commentator in Ottawa's Parliamentary Press Gallery for CHCH Television (now CHCH-DT) of Hamilton and CFCF TV-12 (now CFCF-DT) of Montreal.

References

External links
 

Scott, Geoffroy
Scott, Geoffroy
Progressive Conservative Party of Canada MPs
Members of the House of Commons of Canada from Ontario